Jeffrey S. Yass (born 1956) is an American options trader and billionaire.

He is the co-founder and managing director of the Philadelphia-based Susquehanna International Group (SIG) and an early investor in TikTok. In 2001, he joined the executive advisory council of the Cato Institute.

Yass is considered the richest man in the State of Pennsylvania. An influential political figure, he is one of the 10 largest political donors in the United States.  

According to israeli newspaper Haaretz, he is a major supporter of the Israeli Far-Right. The Jerusalem Post has described his influence as a driving force to weaken rule of law in the country.

Early life
Yass grew up in a middle-class Jewish family in Queens, New York. He is the son of Gerald Yass, and his "childhood sweetheart" Sybil, who was at his bar mitzvah. Gerald has a sister, Carole. Gerald graduated with a BS from LIU Brooklyn in 1951, and worked as an accountant, rising to chairman of Datatab Inc, and later a co-founder of Philadelphia Trading, which became SIG. As of 2018, he still works for SIG, as a senior executive and advisor.

Jeffrey Yass was educated at public schools in Queens. He earned a BA in mathematics and economics from Binghamton University. He pursued graduate studies in economics at New York University, but did not graduate.

Career
While at the State University of New York in Binghamton in the 1970s, Yass and five fellow students became friends and later co-founded Susquehanna International Group (SIG), the largest trader of liquid stocks in the US.

The billionaire trader Israel Englander sponsored Yass for a seat on the Philadelphia Stock Exchange, and SIG was initially run from an office at the Exchange. His father, Gerald Yass, also helped to found the company. Prior to this, Yass was a professional gambler.

Political activities 
Yass became a member of the board of directors of the libertarian Cato Institute in 2002 and now is a member of the executive advisory council. In 2015, Yass donated $2.3 million to a Super PAC supporting Rand Paul's presidential candidacy. In 2018 he donated $3.8m to the Club for Growth, and $20.7m in 2020.

Yass and his wife, Janine Coslett, are public supporters of school choice, with Coslett writing a 2017 opinion piece for the Washington Examiner in support of then-incoming Secretary of Education Betsy DeVos's views at school choice.

In November 2020, it was reported that Yass had donated $25.3 million, all to Republican candidates, and was one of the ten largest political donors in the US.

In March 2021, an investigation in Haaretz said that Jeff Yass  and Arthur Dantchik were behind a large portion of the donations to  the Kohelet Policy Forum in Israel.

In November 2021, he donated $5 million to the School Freedom Fund, a PAC that runs ads for Republican candidates running in the 2022 election cycle nationwide.

In June 2022 Propublica claims Yass has "avoided $1 billion in taxes" and "pouring his money into campaigns to cut taxes and support election deniers".

Recognition
In 2001, Yass appeared as one of 76 Revolutionary Minds in Philadelphia magazine.

As of 2023, he was the richest man in Pennsylvania, according to The Intercept.

Personal life
Yass is married to Janine Coslett. They have lived in Haverford in Lower Merion Township, Pennsylvania for some years. They have four children, two sons and two daughters.

In December 2001, following the aftermath of the September 11 attacks, he announced a donation to the charitable fund established by the Port Authority of New York and New Jersey to assist the victims. He has supported Save the Children, ''Spirit of Golf Foundation'', People's Emergency Center Families First building, and the Franklin Institute's Franklin Family Funfest Committee.

References

Further reading
 

1956 births
Living people
American derivatives traders
American financial analysts
American libertarians
American money managers
Cato Institute people
Stock and commodity market managers
Binghamton University alumni
People from Queens, New York
20th-century American Jews
American company founders
People from Haverford Township, Pennsylvania
21st-century American Jews